The following is a list of attacks which have been carried out by Al-Qaeda.

1990s

1992 
On December 29, 1992, the first attack by Al-Qaeda was carried out in Aden, Yemen known as the 1992 Aden hotel bombings. That evening, a bomb went off at the Gold Mohur hotel, where U.S. troops had been staying while en route to Somalia, though the troops had already left when the bomb exploded.  The bombers targeted a second hotel, the Aden Movenpick, where they believed American troops might also be staying. That bomb detonated prematurely in the hotel car park, around the same time as the other bomb explosion, killing an Austrian tourist and a Yemeni citizen.  Osama bin Laden claimed responsibility for the attack in 1998.

1993 
On February 26, 1993, the World Trade Center was bombed for the first time. A bomb built in Jersey City was driven into an underground garage of the World Trade Center. The blast killed six people and injured over 1,000 others. The attack was not an official al-Qaeda operation, though the attack's mastermind, Ramzi Yousef, had trained in al-Qaeda camps. Osama bin Laden was never charged for the attack.

1995 
On November 13, 1995, a car bomb exploded at a facility in Riyadh, Saudi Arabia where the U.S. military was training Saudi National Guardsmen. Five Americans and two Indians were killed and 60 people were wounded. The attack has been credited to al-Qaeda by the government of Saudi Arabia although Osama bin Laden never took credit for the bombing.

1996 
On June 25, 1996, a massive truck bomb detonated at the Khobar Towers housing complex that was housing US Air Force personnel in Saudi Arabia. 19 Air force servicemen were killed and over 400 injured. While Hezbollah Al-Hejaz was named as the culprit in the bombing, al-Qaeda took responsibility for the bombing.

1998 
In August 1998, Al-Qaeda operatives carried out the bombings of the U.S. embassies in Nairobi, Kenya, and Dar es Salaam, Tanzania, killing 224 people and injuring more than 5,000 others.

2000s

2000
Al-Qaeda planned to attack  on January 3, 2000, but the effort failed due to too much weight being put on the small boat meant to bomb the ship.
Despite the setback with USS The Sullivans, al-Qaeda succeeded in bombing a U.S. Navy warship in October 2000 with the USS Cole bombing, killing 17 sailors.

2001
 On September 9, 2001, two Tunisian members of al-Qaeda assassinated Ahmed Shah Massoud, the leader of the Northern Alliance. One of the suicide attackers was killed by the explosion, while the other was captured and shot while trying to escape. It is believed that Osama Bin Laden ordered Massoud's assassination to help his Taliban protectors and ensure he would have their cooperation in Afghanistan.
 The most destructive act ascribed to al-Qaeda was the series of attacks in the United States on September 11, 2001. Four commercial jet airliners were hijacked. Two of these were crashed into the Twin Towers which later collapsed, destroying the rest of the World Trade Center building complex. The third was crashed into the Pentagon and the fourth in a field during a struggle between passengers and hijackers to control the airplane. Nearly 3,000 people were killed in the attacks, making them the deadliest act of terrorism to occur in history, and more than 6,000 others were injured. An investigation conducted after the attacks concluded that members of al-Qaeda planned and orchestrated the attacks. Osama bin Laden initially denied his organization's involvement, but later in 2004 admitted his organization was responsible. The U.S., amongst other 40 countries, later invaded Afghanistan to dismantle al-Qaeda, sparking the War in Afghanistan and dismantling the Taliban as well.
 On December 22, 2001, al-Qaeda operative Richard Reid attempted to detonate explosives packed into the shoes he was wearing, while on American Airlines Flight 63 from Paris to Miami. In 2002, Reid pleaded guilty in U.S. federal court to eight criminal counts of terrorism, based on his attempt to destroy a commercial aircraft in-flight. He was sentenced to life in prison without parole and is held in a super maximum security prison in the United States.

2002
The April 11, 2002 Ghriba synagogue bombing occurred when a natural gas truck fitted with explosives drove past security barriers at the ancient Ghriba Synagogue on the Tunisian island of Djerba. The truck detonated at the front of the synagogue, killing 14 German tourists, three Tunisians, and two French nationals. More than 30 others were wounded. Al Qaeda later claimed responsibility for the attack.
 The 2002 Limburg bombing occurred on 6 October 2002. The Limburg was carrying 397,000 barrels (63,100 m3) of crude oil from Iran to Malaysia, and was in the Gulf of Aden off Yemen to pick up another load of oil. It was registered under a French-flag and had been chartered by the Malaysian petrol firm Petronas. While it was some distance offshore, an explosives-laden dinghy rammed the starboard side of the tanker and detonated. The vessel caught on fire and approximately 90,000 barrels (14,000 m3) of oil leaked into the Gulf of Aden. Although Yemeni officials initially claimed that the explosion was caused by an accident, later investigations found traces of TNT on the damaged ship. One crew member, a 38-year-old Bulgarian named Atanas Atanasov, was killed, and 12 other crew members were injured.
 On October 8, 2002, two Kuwaiti citizens with ties to jihadist in Afghanistan launched the Faylaka Island attack against United States Marines. The Marines were on a training exercise on Failaka Island, an island off the coast of Kuwait. One Marine was killed, and another was seriously injured. The two Kuwaitis, Anas Al Kandari and Jassem al-Hajiri were also killed. They were reported to have served as volunteers with the Taliban, in Afghanistan, prior to the American response to the attacks of September 11, 2001.
 The 2002 Bali bombings occurred on 12 October 2002 in the tourist district.
 The 2002 Mombasa attacks occurred on 28 November 2002 in Kenya. Al Qaeda later claimed responsibility for the attacks.

2003
 The 2003 Riyadh compound bombings occurred on 12 May 2003, in Riyadh, Saudi Arabia. 39 people were killed, and over 160 wounded.
 The 2003 Casablanca bombings occurred on May 16, 2003, in Casablanca, Morocco. 45 people were killed as a result of these attacks (12 suicide-bombers and 33 victims).
 The 2003 Marriott Hotel bombing occurred on August 5, 2003, in Jakarta, Indonesia. A suicide bomber detonated a car bomb outside the lobby of the JW Marriott Hotel, killing twelve people and injuring 150. Those killed were mostly Indonesian, with the exception of one Dutch.
 The Imam Ali Mosque bombing was the detonation of two car bombs outside of the Shia Imam Ali Mosque in Najaf on August 29, 2003.
 On 8 November 2003, on the day the US State Department warned of further attacks in Saudi Arabia, a suicide truck bomb detonated outside the Al-Mohaya housing compound in Laban Valley, West of Riyadh, killing 18 people and wounding 122.
 The 2003 Istanbul bombings were four truck bomb attacks carried out on November 15, 2003, and November 20, 2003, in Istanbul, Turkey, leaving 57 people dead, and 700 wounded. Several men have been convicted for their involvement.

2004
 The 2004 Irbil bombings was a double suicide attack on the offices of Kurdish political parties in Irbil, Iraq, north of Baghdad on February 2, 2004. The attackers detonated explosives strapped to their bodies as hundreds gathered to celebrate Eid Al-Adha in Irbil.
 The 2 March 2004 Iraq Ashura bombings in Iraq was a series of planned terrorist explosions that killed at least 178 and injured at least 500 Iraqi Shi'a Muslims commemorating the Day of Ashura. The bombings brought one of the deadliest days in the Iraq occupation after the Iraq War to topple Saddam Hussein.
 The 2004 Madrid train bombings occurred on March 11, 2004, where 190 people died. This terrorist attack happened 3 days before the 2004 general election.
 21 April 2004 Basra bombings were a series of large car bomb explosions which ripped through Basra, Iraq.
 Al-Qaeda is believed to have been responsible for the 2004 Khobar massacre, carried out on May 29, 2004.

2005
 A suicide car bombing at the Doha Players theater in Qatar on March 19, 2005, which was the first attack of its kind in the nation, killed a British citizen and injured fifteen other people.
 The 2005 London bombings occurred on 7 July 2005 in London, England. 52 people were killed, and over 700 wounded. 
 The 2005 Musayyib bombing was a suicide attack on a marketplace in Musayyib, Iraq, a town 35 miles south of Baghdad on July 16, 2005.
 The 14 September 2005 Baghdad bombings were a series of more than a dozen terrorist attacks in the Iraqi capital of Baghdad.
 The 2005 Bali bombings occurred on 1 October 2005 in Bali, Indonesia. 20 people were killed, and over 100 wounded.
 The November 2005 Khanaqin bombings were suicide attacks on two Shia mosques in Khanaqin, Iraq.

2006
 The Buratha Mosque bombing was a triple suicide bombing that occurred on April 7, 2006, in Baghdad.
 The 23 November 2006 Sadr City bombings were a series of car bombs and mortar attacks in Iraq that began on 23 November at 15:10 Baghdad time (12:10 Greenwich Mean Time) and ended at 15:55 (12:55 GMT). Six car bombs and two mortar rounds were used in the attack on the Shi'ite Muslim slum in Sadr City.

2007
 The 3 February 2007 Baghdad market bombing was the detonation of a large truck bomb in a busy market in the Iraqi capital of Baghdad on 3 February 2007.  The suicide attack killed at least 135 people and injured 339 others.
 The 2007 Tal Afar bombings and massacre took place on March 27, 2007, when two truck bombs targeted Shia areas of the town of Tal Afar, Iraq, killing 152 and wounding 347 people.
 11 April 2007 Algiers bombings
 The 18 April 2007 Baghdad bombings were a series of attacks that occurred when five car bombs exploded across Baghdad, the capital city of Iraq, on 18 April 2007, killing nearly 200 people.
 The 2007 Yazidi communities bombings occurred at around 8pm local time on August 14, 2007, when four co-ordinated suicide bomb attacks detonated in the Kurdish towns of Kahtaniya and Jazeera (Siba Sheikh Khidir), near Mosul. Iraqi Red Crescent's estimates say the bombs killed 796 and wounded 1,562 people, making this the Iraq War's most deadly car bomb attack during the period of major American combat operations.
 Al-Qaeda is believed to have been responsible for the failed assassination attempt on former Pakistani prime minister Benazir Bhutto on 7 October 2007.
 December 11, 2007 Algiers bombings claimed by al-Qaeda in the Islamic Maghreb

2008
 Al-Qaeda claimed responsibility for the bombing of the Danish embassy in Pakistan on June 2, 2008. Mustafa Abu al-Yazid, a high-ranking member of Al-Qaeda, issued a statement after the bombing, claiming that the attack was a response to the 2005 publication of the Muhammed Cartoons.
 The Battle of Wanat occurred on July 13, 2008, when forces including Al-Qaeda and Taliban guerrillas attacked NATO troops near the village of Wanat in the Waygal district in Afghanistan's far eastern province of Nuristan. The Battle of Wanat has been described as the "Black Hawk Down" of the War in Afghanistan, as one of the bloodiest attacks of the war and one of several attacks on remote outposts.[8] In contrast to previous roadside bombs and haphazard attacks and ambushes, this attack was well coordinated with fighters from many insurgent and terrorist groups with an effort that was disciplined and sustained which was able to target key assets such as the TOW launcher with precision.
 Al-Qaeda is believed to have been responsible for the bombing of the Marriott Hotel in Pakistan on September 20, 2008. A truck bomb killed 54 people and injured 266 people.

2009
 The 19 August 2009 Baghdad bombings were three coordinated car bomb attacks and a number of mortar strikes in the Iraqi capital, Baghdad.
 On 25 October 2009 Baghdad bombings there were attacks in Baghdad, Iraq which killed 155 people and injured at least 721 people.
 Shortly after the arrest of Umar Farouk Abdulmutallab in the December 25, 2009 bombing attack on Northwest Airlines Flight 253, the suspect reportedly told officials he had traveled to Yemen for training by Al-Qaeda, although British counterterrorism officials dismissed the claims. President Barack Obama's top security official Janet Napolitano on December 27 stated "Right now we have no indication it's part of anything larger", warning it would be "inappropriate to speculate" that Al-Qaeda had sent Abdulmutallab on a suicide mission. On December 28, President Obama called it an "attempted terrorist attack" and promised "to use every element of our national power to disrupt, to dismantle and defeat the violent extremists who threaten us, whether they are from Afghanistan or Pakistan...". That same day, Al Qaeda in the Arabian Peninsula claimed responsibility for the attack. The group released photos of Nigerian Umar Farouk Abdulmutallab smiling in a white shirt and white Islamic skullcap with the Al Qaeda in Arabian Peninsula banner in the background. On January 8, 2010, President Barack Obama took responsibility for security lapses exposed by the attack, declaring in televised remarks "We are at war against Al-Qaeda", noting "our adversaries will seek new ways to evade them, as was shown by the Christmas attack" By February 2010, the suspect told federal investigators that cleric Anwar al-Awlaki gave him orders to carry out the attack. Al-Jazeera reported that Awlaki issued a statement that "Brother mujahed Umar Farouk – may God relieve him – is one of my students, yes... We had kept in contact, but I didn't issue a fatwa to Umar Farouk for this operation,".
 An Al-Qaeda agent posing as a double agent killed 7 CIA officers in the Camp Chapman attack on December 30, 2009. The Jordanian man, thought to be an American asset penetrating Al-Qaeda was brought in the wire of the camp and detonated an explosive belt, killing 7 CIA, 1 Jordanian intelligence officer, and seriously wounding six others.

2010s
 The April 2010 Baghdad bombings were a series of bomb attacks in Baghdad, Iraq that killed at least 85 people over two days.
 The 10 May 2010 Iraq attacks were a series of bomb and shooting attacks that occurred in Iraq on 10 May 2010, killing over 100 people and injuring 350, the highest death toll for a single day in Iraq in 2010.
 Al-Qaeda commander Mustafa Abu al-Yazid claimed responsibility for the bombing of a German bakery in India in a posthumous audio tape released on June 15, 2010. The bombing occurred on 13 February 2010. The blast killed 17 people, and injured at least 60 more.
The bombs were discovered as a result of intelligence received from Saudi Arabia's security chief. They were bound from Yemen to the United States, and were discovered at en route stop-overs, in England and in Dubai in the United Arab Emirates.
 The 2 November 2010 Baghdad bombings were a series of bomb attacks in Baghdad, Iraq, that killed more than 110 people.
 On 5 November 2010, al-Qaeda in the Arabian Peninsula (AQAP) took responsibility for the plot. U.S. and British authorities had believed that AQAP, and specifically Anwar al-Awlaki, were behind the bombing attempts.  They also believed the bombs were most likely constructed by AQAP's main explosives expert, Ibrahim Hassan al-Asiri.
 The January 2011 Iraq suicide attacks were a series of three consecutive suicide bombings in Iraq which left at least 133 dead.
 The In Amenas hostage crisis began on 16 January 2013, when al-Qaeda-linked terrorists affiliated with a brigade led by Mokhtar Belmokhtar took over 800 people hostage at the Tigantourine gas facility near In Amenas, Algeria. At least 39 foreign hostages were killed along with an Algerian security guard, as were 29 militants.
 The Charlie Hebdo shooting occurred in Paris, France, on January 7, 2015. 12 people were killed and 11 were wounded. Al-Qaeda in the Arabian Peninsula claimed responsibility for the attack.
 The suicide bombing of Daallo Airlines Flight 159 occurred on 2 February 2016. Only the suicide bomber was killed. Two passengers were injured. Al-Shabaab claimed responsibility for the attack.
 The Naval Air Station Pensacola shooting occurred in Pensacola, Florida on December 6, 2019. Three people were killed and 8 were wounded. The shooter was killed by police. Al Qaeda in the Arabian Peninsula claimed responsibility for the attack.

References

Further reading

External links
 Major Terrorist Acts Suspected of or Inspired by al-Qaeda – Infoplease.com

Islamic terrorist incidents
International terrorism
Terrorist incidents by perpetrator